Eight ships of the Royal Navy have borne the name HMS Lapwing, after the northern lapwing, a species of bird:

 was a 10-gun cutter launched in 1764 and lost in 1765.
 was a 28-gun sixth rate launched in 1785. She was used on harbour service from 1813 and was broken up in 1828.
 was a 6-gun  packet brig launched in 1825, used as a breakwater from 1845, and sold in 1861.
 was a  wooden screw gunvessel launched in 1856 and sold in 1864.
 was a  wooden screw gunvessel launched in 1867 and sold in 1885.
 was a  composite screw gunboat launched in 1889 and sold in 1910.
 was an  launched in 1911 and sold for scrapping in 1921.
 was a  sloop launched in 1943 and sunk by a U-boat in 1945.

Royal Navy ship names